Watson Spring is a spring in the U.S. state of Georgia.

Watson Spring was named after Douglas Watson, an original owner of the site.

References

Rivers of Georgia (U.S. state)
Rivers of Greene County, Georgia